Kensington racecourse is a now-closed pony racecourse on the current site of the University of New South Wales in the suburb of Kensington, Sydney, Australia. The course was in operation between 1893 and 1942, and during the Boer War and World Wars I and II it was taken over as a military camp. Many of the first Anzacs trained at Kensington Racecourse in 1914 before leaving for Egypt and Gallipoli. An extensive account of the training in late 1914 appears in the diary of Archie Barwick.

A migrant hostel was located on the site in the late 1940s. Construction of the University began in 1951.

The Old Tote building of the racecourse survived and in the 1960s and 1970s was the home of the Old Tote Theatre Company. It is now the Figtree Theatre in the grounds of UNSW.

References

Former buildings and structures in Sydney
Sports venues in Sydney
Migrant hostels in Australia
Kensington, New South Wales
1893 establishments in Australia
Sports venues completed in 1893
1942 disestablishments in Australia